Tatyana Polnova, née Zaykova (born 20 April 1979) is a Russian pole vaulter. Between 1998 and 2002 she competed for Turkey under the Turkish name Tuna Köstem. She is currently Fenerbahçe Athletics Club member.

Her personal best is 4.78 metres, achieved in September 2004 in Monaco.

International competitions

See also
List of European Athletics Championships medalists (women)

References

1979 births
Living people
Russian female pole vaulters
Turkish female pole vaulters
Universiade gold medalists in athletics (track and field)
Universiade gold medalists for Russia
Medalists at the 2003 Summer Universiade
World Athletics Championships athletes for Russia
European Athletics Championships medalists
Russian Athletics Championships winners
Fenerbahçe athletes
Naturalized citizens of Turkey
Russian emigrants to Turkey
Turkish people of Russian descent